Bryconamericus indefessus is a species of characin endemic to Argentina, where it is found in the Rio Bermejo basin.

References

Characidae
Fish of South America
Fish of Argentina
Endemic fauna of Argentina
Fish described in 2004